Many colleges and universities have designated mottos that represent the ethos and culture of that institution.

Argentina

Australia

Austria

Bahamas

Bangladesh

Belgium

Botswana

Brazil

Canada

Chile

China

Colombia

Costa Rica

Denmark

Ecuador

Fiji

Finland

France

Germany

Georgia

Ghana

Greece

Hong Kong

Hungary

India

Indonesia

Ireland

Iran

Iraq

Italy

Japan

South Korea

Latvia

Lebanon

Lithuania

Macau

Madagascar

Malaysia

Mexico

Moldova

The Netherlands

New Zealand

Nigeria

Pakistan

Paraguay

Peru

Philippines

Poland

Portugal

Romania

Russia

Rwanda

Singapore

Sri Lanka

South Africa

Sudan

Spain

Switzerland

Sweden

Taiwan

Thailand

Togo

Turkey

Ukraine

United Kingdom

United States

Venezuela

Vietnam

Zimbabwe

See also
 List of military unit mottoes by country

References

Lists of mottos
Higher education-related lists